Mohammed Alimuddin (1920 in Thoubal district – 3 February 1983) was an Indian politician and a former Chief Minister of Manipur. He succeeded Mairembam Koireng Singh, as the Chief Minister of Manipur in 1972 for year and again for 127 days in 1974. He was member of Manipur Peoples Party.

Career 

He was elected to Lilong in first Legislative Assembly election held in 1948.

He also served as speaker in the Raj Kumar Dorendra Singh’s government as well as Finance Minister in the Yangmaso Shaiza’s ministry. During his period, Regional Institute of Medical Sciences a premier medical college in North East India foundation was laid.

References

1920 births
1983 deaths
Chief Ministers of Manipur
20th-century Indian Muslims
Manipur Peoples Party politicians
Speakers of the Manipur Legislative Assembly
People from Thoubal district
Meitei Pangals
Janata Party politicians
Nationalist Congress Party politicians
Manipur MLAs 1972–1974
Manipur MLAs 1974–1979
Manipur MLAs 1967–1972